Bergen is an unincorporated community in Christiania Township, Jackson County, Minnesota, United States.

Bergen is located in Minnesota's 1st congressional district, represented by Republican Jim Hagedorn.  At the state level, Jackson is located in Senate District 22, represented by Republican Doug Magnus, and in House District 22B, represented by Republican Rod Hamilton.

Bergen at one time had a general store, which closed in the 1970's, a meat locker, which is still open, Bergen Meats, a feed and seed (closed in the 1970s), a bar which is now a nice little steak house, a gas station which closed in the late 1960s and there was a one room schoolhouse (later Christiana Town Hall) just down the road, which was just recently torn down. There are still about half a dozen houses or so there.

Notes

Unincorporated communities in Jackson County, Minnesota
Unincorporated communities in Minnesota